Babaafzal Rural District is a rural district (dehestan) in Barzok District, Kashan County, Isfahan Province, Iran. At the 2006 census, its population was 1,904, in 596 families.  The rural district has 5 villages.

References 

Rural Districts of Isfahan Province
Kashan County